Acalolepta holosericea is a species of beetle in the family Cerambycidae. It was described by Stephan von Breuning in 1939. It is known from India.

It's 20 mm long and 6 mm wide, and its type locality is Bajwar, Almora Province.

References

Acalolepta
Beetles described in 1939
Taxa named by Stephan von Breuning (entomologist)